"The Things We Did Last Summer" is a popular song about nostalgia from 1946. The words were written by Sammy Cahn, with the composition by Jule Styne. The most well known version is the 1946 Top ten hit by Jo Stafford. Versions by Frank Sinatra and by Vaughn Monroe also charted that year.  Shelley Fabares had a hit cover in 1962 on the pop chart. Several recordings have been made, including versions by Frank Sinatra, Vaughn Monroe, and Dean Martin who recorded different versions for his 1959 and 1966 Christmas LPs.

Jo Stafford version

"The Things We Did Last Summer" was recorded by Jo Stafford, in a single released in 1946 on the Capitol Records label. Stafford's version of the song was a successful hit, peaking,  at number 10 on the Billboard chart in the United States. Her recording of the song was conducted and arranged by Paul Weston and his Orchestra.

Chart performance

Shelley Fabares version

Shelley Fabares recorded the song in a single released in August 1962 on the Colpix label. It was the second single taken from her second album The Things We Did Last Summer. It was produced and arranged by Stu Phillips.

Reception
"The Things We Did Last Summer" charted at number 46 on the Billboard Hot 100 chart.

Track listing
 "The Things We Did Last Summer" - 2:27
 "Breaking Up is Hard to Do" - 2:05

Chart performance

Other versions 
 Toshiko Akiyoshi - Toshiko Akiyoshi at Maybeck (1994)
 The Beach Boys - Good Vibrations: Thirty Years of The Beach Boys (1993)
 Bing Crosby - recorded August 1, 1946 with Jimmy Dorsey and His Orchestra.
 Vic Damone - This Game of Love (1959)
 Sammy Davis Jr. & Carmen McRae - Boy Meets Girl (1957)
 Dick Farney - Noite (1981)
 Michael Feinstein - Michael Feinstein Sings the Jule Styne Songbook (1991)
 A Fine Frenzy - His Songs, Our Way (2009)
 The Four Lads - On the Sunny Side (1956)
 The Four Preps - The Things We Did Last Summer (1958)
 Eydie Gormé - Love Is a Season (1958)
 Bennie Green - Walking Down (1956)
 Richard "Groove" Holmes - Soul Message (1965)
 Ramon Jacinto - Romancing RJ (2016)
 Beverly Kenney - Snuggled on Your Shoulder (2006)
 Lesley Gore - My Town, My Guy & Me (1965)
 The Lettermen - More Hit Sounds of the Lettermen (1965)
 Dean Martin - A Winter Romance (1959) and The Dean Martin Christmas Album (1966)
 Seth MacFarlane - Once in a While (2019) 
 Helen Merrill - Merrill at Midnight (1957)
 Fats Navarro - Jazz at the Philharmonic, Carnegie Hall (1949)
 Jackie Paris - That Paris Mood  (1954)
 Freddie Redd - Piano: East/West (1955)
 Jane Powell - Can't We Be Friends? (1956)
 George Shearing & Nancy Wilson - The Swingin's Mutual! (1961)
 Sahib Shihab - The Jazz We Heard Last Summer (1957)
 Frank Sinatra - recorded on July 24, 1946 for Columbia Records.

References

1940s jazz standards
1946 songs
1962 singles
Songs with lyrics by Sammy Cahn
Songs with music by Jule Styne
Songs about nostalgia
Torch songs
Dean Martin songs
Frank Sinatra songs
Jo Stafford songs
Shelley Fabares songs
The Beach Boys songs
Vaughn Monroe songs